10 Days Before the Wedding is a 2018 Yemeni drama film directed by Amr Gamal. It was selected as the Yemeni entry for the Best Foreign Language Film at the 91st Academy Awards, but it was not nominated.

Plot
Ten days before the wedding talks about a love story during the civil war in Aden. Its story is presented in a comedy, social, romance and musical with cultural background category.

Cast
 Sali Hamada as Rasha
 Khaled Hamdan as Ma'amon
 Mh'd Nagi Break as Salim
 Qassem Rashad as Mushtaq
 Bakkar Basaraheel as Waleed
 Abeer AbdulKareem as Samar

Release
After the success of the film, Yemen participated within ten days before the wedding in the best foreign movie race in 2019 Oscar prize.

The film was shown ten days before the wedding, in a number of Arab and foreign countries, where it was shown commercially in the United Arab Emirates in all theaters and continued to be shown there for a period of three weeks.

He has exhibited at a number of prestigious American universities such as Harvard, Yale, Georgetown, Pennsylvania, and Virginia.

It was shown at the United Nations building in New York, as well as in the building of the US State Department amid a wide diplomatic presence. The film also presented a special show at the National Library of Morocco and the Smithsonian Museum in Washington, USA, and the Kazan Islamic Film Festival in Russia also bought the rights to show the film publicly in the state of Tatarstan Russian after the mass audience attained by the film at the Kazan Festival.

See also
 List of submissions to the 91st Academy Awards for Best Foreign Language Film
 List of Yemeni submissions for the Academy Award for Best Foreign Language Film

References

External links
 

2018 films
2018 drama films
Yemeni films
2010s Arabic-language films